Šilheřovice is a municipality and village in Opava District in the Moravian-Silesian Region of the Czech Republic. It has about 1,600 inhabitants. It is part of the historic Hlučín Region.

Geography
The western part of the municipality is located in the Opava Hilly Land within the Silesian Lowlands, the eastern part is located in the Ostrava Basin.

History

The first written mention of Šilheřovice is from 1377 deed, when it was part of the Silesian Duchy of Opava in the Lands of the Bohemian Crown. With the Hlučín Region it was annexed by Prussia after the First Silesian War in 1742.

In 1787 the Prussian noble Friedrich von Eichendorff purchased the estates and had a Neoclassical castle built, where his young nephew Joseph von Eichendorff spent several vacations. In 1846 Šilheřovice Castle was acquired by Salomon Mayer von Rothschild, progenitor of the Rothschild banking family of Austria, while in 1920 the Hlučín Region was adjudicated to Czechoslovakia according to the terms of the Treaty of Versailles.

Sport
There is a golf course in the castle park.

Sights
The most notable monument is Šilheřovice Castle, built in 1787–1815. It is surrounded by a large English-style park. Today the castle is privately owned and is partially accessible during the social events.

The Church of the Assumption of the Virgin Mary was built in the Baroque style in 1713.

Notable people
Georg Gawliczek (1919–1999), German football player and coach

References

External links

 
Šilheřovice Castle

Villages in Opava District
Hlučín Region